1962 in professional wrestling describes the year's events in the world of professional wrestling.

List of notable promotions 
Only one promotion held notable shows in 1962.

Calendar of notable shows

Championship changes

EMLL

NWA

Debuts
Debut date uncertain:
Bill Dundee
Bill Watts
Bob Armstrong
Bushwhacker Luke 
Gary Hart
Mr. Fuji
Ox Baker
Ronnie Garvin
January 13  Espanto III
March 19  Dean Ho
November 2 Archie Gouldie

Births
Date of birth uncertain:
Kloudy
January 7  Devil Masami
January 9:
 Luc Poirier
 Tony Puccio 
January 12  Luna Vachon(died in 2010) 
January 21  Mark Curtis(died in 1999) 
February 11  Bestia Salvaje(died in 2008) 
February 13  Baby Doll (wrestler)
February 19  Franky Gee (died in 2005) 
February 21  Billy Silverman 
March 13  Vandal Drummond
March 19  Jimmy Korderas
March 22  Villano V
March 28  The Warlord
April 3:
 Curly Moe (died in 2015)
Jeff Van Camp 
April 10  Super Muñeco (died in 2022) 
April 12  Nobuhiko Takada
April 13  Diane Von Hoffman (died in 2017) 
April 29  Sunshine 
May 5  Princess Victoria (wrestler)
May 10  Klondyke Kate
May 22  Brian Pillman(died in 1997) 
May 26  Victor Zangiev
May 30  Martha Villalobos
June 13  Virgil
June 15  Brad Armstrong (died in 2012)
June 18  Mitsuharu Misawa(died in 2009) 
June 26  Bruiser Costa
July 2  Brakkus
July 5  Barry Hardy
July 15  Jesús Castillo Jr.
July 18  Dusty Wolfe 
July 29:
Scott Steiner
Sonny Onoo
Pirata Morgan
July 31  Kevin Greene(died in 2020) 
July 31  John Laurinaitis
August 2 - DeWayne Bruce 
August 14  Jeff Farmer
August 15  Kazuo Yamazaki 
September 2  Tracy Smothers(died in 2020)
September 7  George South
September 28  Atlantis
October 2  El Dandy
October 19  Evander Holyfield 
October 31  Bill Fralic(died in 2018) 
November 4  El Hijo del Diablo
November 24:
Velvet McIntyre
Masayoshi Motegi 
November 28  Davey Boy Smith(died in 2002) 
November 30  Jimmy Del Ray(died in 2014) 
December 16  William Perry 
December 23  Keiji Muto
December 26  Mark Starr(died in 2013)

Deaths
March 2  Gus Kallio (70)
April 20  Joe Malcewicz (65)
August 9  Sam Avey (67)
September 26  Alexander Zass (74)

References

 
professional wrestling